The Supreme Court of Fiji is one of three courts established by the now-defunct Chapter 9 of the Constitution, the others being the High Court and the Court of Appeal. The Supreme Court is declared to be "the final appellate court of the State" – in other words, there is no judicial authority higher than the Supreme Court. In this respect, the Supreme Court takes over the appellate functions formerly performed by the United Kingdom's Judicial Committee of the Privy Council before Fiji became a republic in 1987.

The Constitution gave the Supreme Court exclusive jurisdiction to hear and determine appeals from all final judgements of the Court of Appeal. Cases could not be brought before the Supreme Court by individuals; only the Court of Appeal could decide to refer a case to it, or the Supreme Court could, in its own judgement, decide to hear an appeal. This court has the power to review, vary, affirm, or discard decisions of the Court of Appeal, may order retrials, and may award costs to defendants and plaintiffs. Decisions of the Supreme Court are binding on all subordinate courts. At its own discretion, the Supreme Court may review any judgement or decision that it has previously rendered.

Section 123 authorised the President of Fiji, on the advice of the Cabinet, to ask the Supreme Court to rule on actual or potential disagreements pertaining to the Constitution.  The Supreme Court is required to pronounce its opinion in open court.

The Supreme Court consists of the Chief Justice, who is also the President of the Supreme Court, all Justices of Appeal (who are also members of the Court of Appeal), and others specifically appointed as Supreme Court judges. The puisne judges, who sit on the High Court and the Court of Appeal, are not members of the Supreme Court.  Section 129 of the Constitution declares that "A judge who has sat in a trial of a matter that is the subject of appeal to a higher court must not sit in the appeal." As the membership of the Supreme Court overlaps to a large extent with that of the Appeal Court and the High Court, this clause is inserted to prevent a conflict of interest.

See also

 Constitution of Fiji: Chapter 9 (detailing the composition and role of the judiciary)

External links
 Jurist Legal Intelligence – Fiji Islands

Law of Fiji
Fiji
1997 establishments in Fiji
Courts and tribunals established in 1997